The 1983–84 Scottish First Division season was won by Morton, who were promoted along with Dumbarton to  the Premier Division. Raith Rovers and Alloa Athletic were relegated to the Second Division.

Table

References

1983-1984
2
Scot